Sibha is a village of remote eastern part of Nepal located in Tamku VDC.

References

Populated places in Sankhuwasabha District